Tau Kappa Epsilon brothers (commonly referred to as Tekes) are individuals who have been initiated into Tau Kappa Epsilon Fraternity. The fraternity was founded by five men – Joseph Lorenzo Settles, James Carson McNutt, Clarence Arthur Mayer, Owen Ison Truitt, and Charles Roy Atkinson on January 10, 1899, at Illinois Wesleyan University in Bloomington, Illinois. Members traditionally are initiated into a chapter during their collegiate career, although honorary members may not necessarily have attended a university or college. As of 2022, the fraternity has more than 295,000 initiated members, 221 active chapters and colonies, and almost 12,000 collegiate members.

The list of Tau Kappa Epsilon brothers spans over multiple careers including politics, business, athletics, and entertainment. Among the most recognized include U.S. President Ronald Reagan who was the recipient of the Order of the Golden Eagle, the fraternity's highest honor. Other widely recognized political figures include former West Virginia Senator Robert Byrd, who at the time of his death was the longest-serving member in the history of the United States Congress, and former Arkansas Governor and Republican presidential candidate Mike Huckabee, who while running for president launched a -specific website and visited Tekes on the campaign trail.

Dozens of top chief executive officers (CEOs) and university presidents have also made the list such as Starbucks CEO Howard Schultz, Salesforce CEO Marc Benioff, and Steve Forbes of Forbes magazine, who was the fraternity's 250,000th initiate. Numerous athletic and music superstars are also Tekes including NFL quarterbacks Terry Bradshaw, Phil Simms, and Aaron Rodgers, Olympians Douglas Blubaugh, Sim Iness, and Johnny Quinn, and singers Elvis Presley, Willie Nelson, and the Everly Brothers.

Federal government and military

President of the United States

U.S. Senate

U.S. House of Representatives

U.S. Courts

Agency executives and ambassadors

Military and uniformed services

NASA

State and local government

Governors

State government

Mayors

Native American government

Canadian government

Business and industry

Journalism and broadcasting

Education

Discoverers and researchers

Athletics

Baseball

Basketball

Football

Olympics

Soccer

Wrestling and Boxing

Entertainment

Writers

Notes

References

Tau Kappa Epsilon
brothers